Iosif Lvovich Grinberg (19061980) was a Soviet literary critic.

An alumnus of Leningrad State University, he began his career in 1931 and was member of the Union of Soviet Writers. He is most well known for his commentary on various Soviet poets, including Vera Inber, to whom he devoted a full-scale critical work.

References

1906 births
1980 deaths
Soviet Jews
Soviet non-fiction writers
Soviet male writers
20th-century male writers
20th-century non-fiction writers
Male non-fiction writers